San Fernando General Hospital is located in the City of San Fernando, Trinidad and Tobago. It is considered as the main trauma unit for the Southern region of the Island of Trinidad.

This Institution falls under the South West Regional Health Authority (SWRHA).

References

Hospitals in Trinidad and Tobago